Dana Wynter (born Dagmar Winter; 8 June 19315 May 2011) was a German-born British actress, who was raised in the United Kingdom and southern Africa. She appeared in film and television for more than 40 years, beginning in the 1950s. Her best-known film performance was in Invasion of the Body Snatchers (1956). A tall, dark, elegant beauty, she played both victim and villain. Her characters both in film and on television sometimes faced horrific dangers which they often did not survive, but she also played scheming, manipulative women on television mysteries and crime procedural dramas.

Early life
Wynter was born in Berlin, Germany, the daughter of Dr. Peter Winter, a British surgeon of German descent, and his wife Jutta Oarda, a native of Hungary.

She grew up in Britain. When she was 16, her father visited friends in Southern Rhodesia (Zimbabwe today), fell in love with the country, and brought his daughter and her stepmother to live with him there.

Dana Wynter (as she called herself and pronounced Donna) later enrolled at South Africa's Rhodes University in 1949. She studied medicine while also pursuing theatre, playing the blind girl in a school production of Through a Glass Darkly, a role in which she said she had been "terrible". After a year of studies, she returned to Britain and turned to acting.

Career

British films
Wynter began her cinema career at age 20 in 1951, playing small roles, often uncredited, in British films. One such was Lady Godiva Rides Again (1951) in which other future leading ladies, Kay Kendall, Diana Dors, and Joan Collins played similarly small roles. She was appearing in the play Hammersmith when an American agent told her he wanted to represent her. She was again uncredited when she played Morgan Le Fay's servant in the MGM film Knights of the Round Table (1953).

Wynter left for New York on 5 November 1953, Guy Fawkes Day (which commemorates a failed attempt in 1605 to blow up Parliament). "There were all sorts of fireworks going off," she later told an interviewer, "and I couldn't help thinking it was a fitting send-off for my departure to the New World."

New York
Wynter had more success in New York than in London. She appeared on the stage and on TV, where she had leading roles in Robert Montgomery Presents (1953), Suspense (1954), Studio One (1955), a 1963 episode of The Virginian ("If You Have Tears"), and a 1965 episode of The Alfred Hitchcock Hour ("An Unlocked Window"), which won an Edgar Award.

20th Century Fox
She moved to Hollywood, where in 1955 she was placed under contract by 20th Century Fox. In that same year, she won the Golden Globe award for Most Promising Newcomer, a title she shared with Anita Ekberg and Victoria Shaw. She graduated to playing major roles in major films. She co-starred with Kevin McCarthy, Larry Gates, and Carolyn Jones, playing Becky Driscoll in the original film version of Invasion of the Body Snatchers (1956).

She starred opposite Robert Taylor in D-Day the Sixth of June (1956), alongside Rock Hudson and Sidney Poitier in Something of Value (1957), Mel Ferrer in Fräulein (1958), Robert Wagner in In Love and War (1958), James Cagney and Don Murray in Shake Hands with the Devil (1959) and the last of her 20th Century Fox contract roles opposite Kenneth More in Sink the Bismarck! (1960).

1960s
She then starred opposite Danny Kaye in On the Double (1961), and George C. Scott in The List of Adrian Messenger (1963).

In shooting two films in Ireland, she made a second home there with her husband, Hollywood divorce lawyer Greg Bautzer. Over the following two decades, she guest-starred in dozens of television series, including the title character in several Wagon Train episodes, such as "The Barbara Lindquist Story", and in occasional roles in films such as Airport (1970). She appeared as various British women in the ABC television series Twelve O'Clock High (1964–66).

In 1966–67, she co-starred with Robert Lansing (who had been the original star of Twelve O'Clock High) on The Man Who Never Was, but the series lasted only one season. She guest-starred in 1968 in The Invaders in the episode "The Captive", and in 1969, on the second version of The Donald O'Connor Show. On Get Smart, The Rockford Files, and Hart to Hart, she played beautiful, upper-class schemers and villains.She also was on an episode of The Love Boat “Sounds of Silence “

Later career
She appeared in the Irish soap opera, Bracken (1978–80). In 1993, she returned to television to play Raymond Burr's wife in The Return of Ironside.

Personal life

In 1956, Wynter married celebrity divorce lawyer Greg Bautzer; they divorced in 1981.  Bautzer and she had one child: Mark Ragan Bautzer, born on 29 January 1960. Wynter, once referred to as Hollywood's "oasis of elegance", divided her time between her homes in California and Glendalough, County Wicklow, Ireland. An anti-apartheid advocate, she refused to open a performance center in South Africa because she discovered that black and white children would have to attend on alternate days. She also planned to make a film criticising the policy, which was to have been written by an American and filmed in Australia. 

In the late 1980s, Wynter authored the column "Grassroots" for The Guardian newspaper in London. Writing in both Ireland and California, her works concentrated mainly on life in both locations leading her to use the titles Irish Eyes and California Eyes for a number of her publications.

In July 2008 Wynter was involved in a legal dispute over the proceeds of the sale of a €125,000 Paul Henry painting, Evening on Achill Sound. The painting, which hung in the family home in County Wicklow, was said to have been bought for her in 1996 by her son as a gift. The dispute was resolved in the High Court in 2009.

Death
Wynter died on 5 May 2011 from congestive heart failure at the Ojai Valley Community Hospital's Continuing Care Center; she was 79 years old. She had suffered from heart disease in later years, and was transferred from the hospital's intensive care unit earlier in the day. Her son Mark said she was not expected to survive, and "she stepped off the bus very peacefully."

Filmography

Awards

References

External links

 "Actress Dana Wynter dies in Ojai", Ojai Valley News

1931 births
2011 deaths
20th-century British actresses
20th Century Studios contract players
British expatriates in Ireland
British expatriates in the United States
British film actresses
British people of German descent
British people of Hungarian descent
British television actresses
Rhodes University alumni
New Star of the Year (Actress) Golden Globe winners
20th-century British businesspeople